Barry "The Boot" Everitt (born 9 March 1976 in Nenagh, Ireland) is a teacher and former rugby union footballer, who played at fly-half for Garryowen FC  Munster, Leinster, London Irish and Northampton Saints. He started in the 2002 Powergen Cup Final at Twickenham, scoring five conversions and a penalty as London Irish defeated the Northampton Saints.

Everitt was called up to the senior Ireland squad for a Test against Samoa in November 2001. He won three trophies in his time at Northampton; the RFU Championship in 2008, the European Rugby Challenge Cup in 2009 and the Anglo-Welsh Cup in 2010. Everitt holds the record for the most individual points scored in a Premiership Season, having scored 343 points for London Irish in the 2001/02 season.

Everitt played for the Barbarians in June 2002 against Scotland in Murrayfield.

Retiring from rugby in July 2010, Everitt was appointed Director of Sport at Cranmore, an independent day school  for boys and girls in West Horsley, Surrey. As of September 2020, he is now Headmaster.

References

External links
Northampton profile
Guinness Premiership Profile

1976 births
Northampton Saints players
Living people
Irish rugby union players
London Irish players